Wally Heider (né Wallace Beck Heider; 20 May 1922 Sheridan, Oregon – 22 March 1989) was an American recording engineer and recording studio owner who refined and advanced the art of studio and remote recording and was instrumental in recording the San Francisco Sound in the late 1960s and early 1970s, recording notable acts including Jefferson Airplane, Crosby, Stills, Nash & Young, Van Morrison, the Grateful Dead, Creedence Clearwater Revival, and Santana. 

Heider also amassed a collection of remote recordings of Big Bands broadcasting via radio from the middle 1930s into the 1950s, preserving some of the only known recordings of complete arrangements of many notable artists of the era, including entire sections of arrangements that otherwise had to be cut from recordings made in commercial recording studios, due to timing constraints of recording technology at that time.

Biography

Early life and education
Heider attended the University of Oregon music school and played saxophone in a 12-piece band he founded. After bandleaders directed him to turn away from microphones due to his poor playing, he decided to pursue recording instead. Heider earned a law degree from Hasting Law School and worked as an attorney until the mid 1950s.

Career

United Recording
Heider moved from Oregon to Los Angeles in the late 1950s and was hired by Bill Putnam to work at United Recording as a part-time apprentice, eventually working his way up to apprentice. By 1960, Heider was working as second engineer at United, later taking on the role of chief engineer at Putnam's United Recording Corporation of Nevada (URCON) in Las Vegas, which included both recording studios and a remote recording truck. Heider also leased his mobile recording equipment to United and managed their remote recording business for 18 months.

Remote recording

Beginning modestly in Los Angeles in 1958 with an Ampex 351 in the back of a station wagon, Heider began to establish remote recording techniques, recording big bands like Woody Herman. By the time Heider's remote recording truck was hired by Capitol Records to record The Beatles at the Hollywood Bowl in 1964, it was a converted 14-foot Dodge box truck, outfitted with a pair of Ampex tape machines and a 12-input, 3-output Universal Audio mixing console built by Bill Putnam. developing remote recording throughout the 1960s and 1970s. Many of Heider's recordings became hits or critical successes. One of them is the classic album Live in Concert by Ray Charles, captured in 1964 at the Shrine Auditorium in Los Angeles. Heider recorded the Monterey Jazz Festival in 1966 and the Monterey Pop Festival in 1967; its many musical acts and the increasing importance of high-quality sound for a concert film signaled a major shift in scale and importance for the remote truck operator.

Recording studios

Heider established Wally Heider Recording at 1604 N. Cahuenga Boulevard in Hollywood in the early 1960s, recording with musicians like Crosby Stills and Nash and Jefferson Airplane.

After working with Bay Area musicians and doing remote recording at the Monterey Jazz Festival and the Monterey Pop Festival, Heider recognized that musicians involved in the San Francisco Sound were having to travel to Los Angeles or New York to record. In 1979, Heider addressed that need by opening Wally Heider Studios at 245 Hyde Street in San Francisco's Tenderloin District across from the Black Hawk nightclub, where he had recorded a series of Miles Davis's live sessions in the mid '60s.

Notable recordings
Many of Rolling Stone magazine's Top 500 albums were recorded in Heider's studios including Volunteers by Jefferson Airplane, Everybody Knows This Is Nowhere by Neil Young with Crazy Horse, Déjà Vu by Crosby, Stills, Nash & Young, Electric Warrior by T. Rex, Tupelo Honey by Van Morrison,  American Beauty by the Grateful Dead, Green River by Creedence Clearwater Revival, Amazing Grace by Aretha Franklin, Procol Harum Live: In Concert with the Edmonton Symphony Orchestra, and Abraxas by Santana.

Big Band era recordings

Heider's remote recordings of Big Bands broadcasting via radio from the middle 1930s into the 1950s are a treasure trove of "live" recordings performed by a wide assortment of some of the most notable, (as well as lesser known), big band, jazz and popular artists of the entire period.  Many of these broadcast recordings provide some of the only known recordings of complete arrangements by those artists, and include entire sections of arrangements that otherwise had to be cut from recordings made in commercial recording studios, because of the timing constraint that was prevalent for records throughout the entire pre-LP recording era. (Recordings made for commercial release on 10" 78-RPM records could not exceed three minutes and thirty seconds of music, and many jukeboxes were automatically timed to change records at 3:20.)

Heider's initial collection of recordings from this era formed the basis of the Hindsight Records catalogue, acquired from Heider in 1979 by Thomas Gramuglia. Through Heider, Hindsight ended up owning over 9,000 copyrights and masters. In 1986, Wally Heider hired music-film consultant Joseph Nicoletti Jr. of Laguna Beach, California to make and present the Big Band masters to MCA, Sony-Interscope, Paramount Pictures and many more broadcast and marketing companies.

After obtaining the rights to Big Band short films of the 1940s and ‘50s originally produced to be shown at movie theaters between double features, Heider founded Swing-Time Video, editing the films and reissuing them on videocassette.

Career chronology
1941, 1946: production of several  Alvino Rey and his Orchestra hits, including Bumble Boogie (1946)
'60s Big band and pop recordings
disciple of Bill Putnam; assisted at United Western Recorders in Hollywood
1966 Monterey Jazz Festival remote recordings; met Dale Manquen
1967 Monterey Pop Festival remote recordings
1968 Studio 3, Los Angeles Crosby Stills & Nash
1968-1980 Wally Heider Studios, 245 Hyde Street, San Francisco
1969 remote 24-track recording
1970 remote 8-track recording; for example Creedence Clearwater Revival at Oakland Coliseum.
1971-72 1971-72 dual 2-inch 24-track remote truck recording; e.g. Procol Harum Live: In Concert with the Edmonton Symphony Orchestra at the Jubilee Auditorium, Edmonton Alberta, Canada.
August 20, 1972 Wattstax recording
1974-75 remote concert recordings in the Los Angeles area
Instrument rental business in San Francisco until Dolph Rempp and SIR came along
1975 studio at 1604 N. Cahuenga, Los Angeles
1976 Filmways

Musicians, Albums, Concerts
Woody Herman
Gary Tole
The Who, Monterey Pop
Jimi Hendrix, Monterey Pop Festival 1967
Jimi Hendrix, Band Of Gypsys (New York, Fillmore East) 1970
Ravi Shankar, Monterey Pop
The Beach Boys: Smiley Smile, Lei'd in Hawaii (unreleased), Wild Honey, 20/20 ("Time to Get Alone" only)
Bob Marley and the Wailers, Live at the Roxy
Crosby, Stills and Nash, CSN 1969
Crosby, Stills, Nash and Young, Deja Vu
Jefferson Airplane
Hot Tuna
David Bowie
Doobie Brothers
Grateful Dead
Jefferson Starship
Starship
Fleetwood Mac
Don Kirshner's Rock Concert
Creedence Clearwater Revival
Earth, Wind & Fire
Herbie Hancock
The Jacksons
Stan Kenton
Bee Gees, "Here At Last Live"
Frampton Comes Alive - West Coast shows
Dizzy Gillespie, album Free Ride

Engineers
John (Jack) Crymes Jr., Recording Engineer, Senior Electrical Engineer (Remote Recording, Wally Heider Recording, Hollywood)
Rik Pekkonnen (Wally Heider Recording, Hollywood)
Stephen Jarvis (Wally Heider Studio, San Francisco 1970-75)
David Fraser (Automatt)
Russ Gary (Wally Heider Studio, San Francisco 1968-71) (helped prep Hyde Street for opening 1968-69)
Stephen Barncard
Ellen Burke (Wally Heider Studio, San Francisco)
Lesley Barncard (1975 Cahuenga)
Leslie Ann Jones (Automatt)
Maureen Droney (Automatt)
Michael Rosen (Automatt)
John Nowl (Automatt)
Fred Catero (Automatt)
Jeffrey Cohen (Automatt)
Tom Scott (1966)
Gray Odell (1966)
Ben Gardner
Michael Patterson
Ken Caillat
Dan Agostino (Wally Heider Recording, Hollywood 1974-76)
Richard Dashut
Chris Morris (for Fleetwood Mac, 1975)
Ken Kessie (Automatt)
Steve Mantoani
Jim Simon (Filmways/Heiders 1978-83)
Mel Tanner
Harry Sitam
Frank DeMedio
George Fernandez (first session, Wally Heider Studio, San Francisco 1969)
Jerry Martin (Wally Heider Studio, San Francisco 1969)
Dave LaBarre
Bill Halverson (1966 Monterey crew)
Grover Hemsley (1966 Monterey crew)
Ken Hopkins (Wally Heider Studio, San Francisco 1970)
Dave Mancini
Steve Malcolm (1974-80)
 Biff Dawes (Woody Herman, Live at Monterey) (Cahuenga 1971-82)
Gabby Garcia (Cahuenga 1971-79)
Larry Cox (Wally Heider Studio, San Francisco and Wally Heider Recording, Hollywood 1968-78)
David Coffin (Wally Heider Studio, San Francisco)
 Andrew Bloch, Hustler/Engineer - Various remote and studio recordings (Cahuenga 1972-78)
 Howie Schwartz, Engineer/Assistant (Hollywood Selma/Hyde St. 1969-1971)
 Steve Hirsch, Engineer/Assistant (Hollywood Selma/RCA Studio B/Various Remotes/Wally Heider Studio, San Francisco 1976-81)

References

External links

 Wally Heider website

American audio engineers
1989 deaths
1923 births
20th-century American engineers